Lucien Olivier (1838–14 November 1883) was a Russian chef of Belgian and French descent and owner of the Hermitage restaurant in the center of Moscow, Russian Empire, in the early 1860s. He was born in Moscow. Olivier is known for the creation of Olivier salad, also known as "Russian salad". The secret of the recipe was not disclosed until his death. Lucien Olivier died in Yalta from heart disease at the age of 45 in 1883 and was buried at Vvedenskoye Cemetery. His tomb was lost until 2008. The current salad has numerous variations which are a mixture of every component Olivier used to add to his famous dish, as well as ingredients that he did not use himself, with a mayonnaise dressing.

References

External links
 Москвичам расскажут всю правду об Оливье.
 Салат Оливье. Реферат.

1838 births
1883 deaths
Inventors from the Russian Empire
Chefs from the Russian Empire
Russian people of Belgian descent
Russian people of French descent
Russian chefs
Burials at Vvedenskoye Cemetery